Acrolophus maculisecta is a moth of the family Acrolophidae. It is found from Mexico to South America.

References

Moths described in 1914
maculisecta